Hendel Brothers, Sons and Company Hat Factory, also known as "The Hat Factory," is a historic factory building located in Reading, Berks County, Pennsylvania.  The original section was built about 1850, as a woolen mill. It is a three-story, brick building with the central section measuring 62 feet by 130 feet. It has a three-story south wing, two-story north wing, and small two-story west wing.  It is of heavy timber frame construction, and features large arched double hung windows.  A hat factory operated in the building until about 1930, after which it was used as a warehouse and trucking terminal.

It was listed on the National Register of Historic Places in 1979.

References

Industrial buildings and structures on the National Register of Historic Places in Pennsylvania
Industrial buildings completed in 1850
Buildings and structures in Berks County, Pennsylvania
National Register of Historic Places in Reading, Pennsylvania